Some branches of economics and game theory deal with indivisible goods, discrete items that can be traded only as a whole. For example, in combinatorial auctions there is a finite set of items, and every agent can buy a subset of the items, but an item cannot be divided among two or more agents.

It is usually assumed that every agent assigns subjective utility to every subset of the items. This can be represented in one of two ways:
The fact that an agent prefers a set  to a set  is written .
The utility an agent gets from a set  is written . Cardinal utility functions are often normalized such that , where  is the empty set.

A cardinal utility function implies a preference relation:  implies  and  implies . Utility functions can have several properties.

Monotonicity 
Monotonicity means that an agent always (weakly) prefers to have extra items. Formally:
 For a preference relation:  implies .
 For a utility function:  implies  (i.e. u is a monotone function).

Monotonicity is equivalent to the free disposal assumption: if an agent may always discard unwanted items, then extra items can never decrease the utility.

Additivity 

Additivity (also called linearity or modularity) means that "the whole is equal to the sum of its parts." That is, the utility of a set of items is the sum of the utilities of each item separately. This property is relevant only for cardinal utility functions. It says that for every set  of items,

assuming that . In other words,  is an additive function.

An additive utility function is characteristic of independent goods. For example, an apple and a hat are considered independent: the utility a person receives from having an apple is the same whether or not he has a hat, and vice versa. A typical utility function for this case is given at the right.

Submodularity and supermodularity 

Submodularity means that "the whole is not more than the sum of its parts (and may be less)."

In other words,  is a submodular set function.

.

A submodular utility function is characteristic of substitute goods. For example, an apple and a bread loaf can be considered substitutes: the utility a person receives from eating an apple is smaller if he has already ate bread (and vice versa), since he is less hungry in that case. A typical utility function for this case is given at the right.

Supermodularity is the opposite of submodularity: it means that "the whole is not less than the sum of its parts (and may be more)".

In other words,  is a supermodular set function.

.

A supermoduler utility function is characteristic of complementary goods. For example, an apple and a knife can be considered complementary: the utility a person receives from an apple is larger if he already has a knife (and vice versa), since it is easier to eat an apple after cutting it with a knife. A possible utility function for this case is given at the right.

A utility function is additive if and only if it is both submodular and supermodular.

Subadditivity and superadditivity 

Subadditivity means that for every pair of disjoint sets 

In other words,  is a subadditive set function.

Assuming  is non-negative, every submodular function is subadditive. 
However, there are non-negative subadditive functions that are not submodular. 
For example, assume that there are 3 identical items, and Z, and the utility depends only on their quantity. The table on the right describes a utility function that is subadditive but not submodular, since

Superadditivity means that for every pair of disjoint sets 

In other words,  is a superadditive set function.

Assuming  is non-positive, every supermodular function is superadditive.
However, there are non-negative superadditive functions that are not supermodular. 
For example, assume that there are 3 identical items, and Z, and the utility depends only on their quantity. The table on the right describes a utility function that is non-negative and superadditive but not supermodular, since

With the typical assumption that , every submodular function is subadditive and every supermodular function is superadditive.
Without any assumption on the utility from the empty set, these relations do not hold.

In particular, if a submodular function is not subadditive, then  must be negative.
This utility function is submodular and supermodular and non-negative except on the empty set, but is not subadditive, since

Also, if a supermodular function is not superadditive, then  must be positive.
Suppose instead that .
This utility function is non-negative, supermodular, and submodular, but is not superadditive, since

Unit demand 

Unit demand (UD) means that the agent only wants a single good. If the agent gets two or more goods, he uses the one of them that gives him the highest utility, and discards the rest. Formally:
 For a preference relation: for every set  there is a subset  with cardinality , such that .
 For a utility function:  For every set :

A unit-demand function is an extreme case of a submodular function. It is characteristic of goods that are pure substitutes. For example, if there are an apple and a pear, and an agent wants to eat a single fruit, then his utility function is unit-demand, as exemplified in the table at the right.

Gross substitutes 

Gross substitutes (GS) means that the agents regards the items as substitute goods or independent goods but not complementary goods. There are many formal definitions to this property, all of which are equivalent. 
 Every UD valuation is GS, but the opposite is not true. 
 Every GS valuation is submodular, but the opposite is not true. 
See Gross substitutes (indivisible items) for more details.

Hence the following relations hold between the classes:

See diagram on the right.

Aggregates of utility functions 
A utility function describes the happiness of an individual. Often, we need a function that describes the happiness of an entire society. Such a function is called a social welfare function, and it is usually an aggregate function of two or more utility functions. If the individual utility functions are additive, then the following is true for the aggregate functions:

See also

Utility functions on divisible goods
Single-minded agent

References 

Utility function types
Combinatorial optimization